"God Only Knows" is a song by American rock band the Beach Boys from their 1966 album Pet Sounds. Written by Brian Wilson and Tony Asher, it is a Baroque-style love song distinguished for its harmonic innovation and complexity, its unusual instrumentation, and its subversion of typical popular song conventions, both lyrically and musically. It is often praised as one of the greatest songs of all time and as the Beach Boys' finest record.

The song's musical sophistication is demonstrated by its three contrapuntal vocal parts and weak tonal center (competing between the keys of E and A). Lyrically, the words are expressed from the perspective of a narrator who asserts that life without their lover could only be fathomed by God—an entity that had been considered taboo to name in the title or lyric of a pop song. It marked a departure for Wilson, who attributed the impetus for the song to Asher's affinity for standards such as "Stella by Starlight". Some commentators interpret "God Only Knows" as promoting suicidal ideations, although such an interpretation was not intended by the songwriters.

Wilson produced the record between March and April 1966, enlisting about 20 session musicians who variously played drums, sleigh bells, plastic orange juice cups, clarinets, flutes, strings, French horn, accordion, guitars, upright bass, harpsichord, and a tack piano with its strings taped. His brother Carl Wilson sang lead, a vocal performance that became regarded as Carl's best ever, with Brian himself and Bruce Johnston providing additional harmonies. The song ends with a series of repeating vocal rounds, another device that was uncommon for popular music of the era.

"God Only Knows" was issued as the B-side of "Wouldn't It Be Nice" in July 1966 and peaked at number 39 on the Billboard Hot 100. In other countries, it was the single's A-side, reaching the top 10 in the UK, Canada, Norway, and the Netherlands. Many songwriters, including Paul McCartney and Jimmy Webb, have cited "God Only Knows" as their favorite song of all time. In 2004, it was included in the Rock and Roll Hall of Fame's "500 Songs That Shaped Rock and Roll". In 2021, it was ranked number 11 in Rolling Stones list of the greatest songs in history.

Inspiration
"God Only Knows" is among the several songs that Brian Wilson and Tony Asher wrote for the Beach Boys' Pet Sounds album. Asher felt that it was the pair's most effortless collaboration, remembering that Wilson "spent more time tweaking the instrumental part than we did writing the words!" Recalling "God Only Knows", Wilson acknowledged that he himself had "not written that kind of song" before and explained, "I think Tony had a musical influence on me somehow. After about ten years, I started thinking about it deeper [...] And I remember him talking about [the 1944 standard] 'Stella by Starlight' and he had a certain love for classic songs." Asher concurred that he felt he had inspired Wilson to write the song.

Wilson's 1991 memoir states that the melody for "God Only Knows" derived from "a John Sebastian song I had been listening to". When presented with this information, Asher and Sebastian said they were unaware of such a connection. Biographer Mark Dillon suggested that, if the claim was true, then Wilson's inspiration would likely have been the vocal layering on "You Didn't Have to Be So Nice", a recent hit by Sebastian's band the Lovin' Spoonful. In later interviews, Wilson said that he wrote "God Only Knows" as an attempt to match the standard of the Beatles' album Rubber Soul (released in December 1965). In his recollection, he was under the influence of marijuana and was "so blown away" with the album that he sat at his piano and began writing the song.

Asked about Pet Sounds in various interviews, Wilson frequently emphasized the album's spiritual qualities, saying that he had held prayer sessions with his brother Carl and "kind of made [the album] a religious ceremony." At the time of the song's writing, he was married to singer Marilyn Rovell. Writing in his book about the album, Jim Fusilli noted a closing phrase Wilson had once written to his wife in 1964: "Yours 'til God wants us apart." In a 1976 radio interview, Wilson said that the song was not written for anyone in particular. Marilyn, who felt that much of the lyrical content on Pet Sounds was aimed at herself, commented of the song, "I'm the only one here, so it must be about me. Then I would think, 'No it wasn't.

Lyrics

At the time the song was written, referencing "God" in a title or lyric was generally considered a taboo for pop music, and there had been at least one recent instance of a record being banned from radio for having words such as "hell" or "damn". Asher said that he and Wilson had "lengthy conversations" about the lyric, "because unless you were Kate Smith and you were singing 'God Bless America', no one thought you could say God' in a song.[...] He said, 'We'll just never get any air play." He believed that Wilson agreed to the title after being told by other people that it was "an opportunity to be really far out [because] it would cause some controversy, which he didn't mind." Dillon wrote that referring to God may have also been viewed as "a square move" due to the nascent decline of traditional religion in the United States.

In the lyrics, the narrator anticipates the dissolution of their romantic relationship, and asserts that life without their lover could only be fathomed by God. The deceptive opening line, "I may not always love you" was the subject of another argument between the songwriters. According to Asher, "I liked that twist, and fought to start the song that way. Working with Brian, I didn't have a whole lot of fighting to do, but I was certainly willing to fight for the end for that." In the next line, the narrator reassures that they will be with their lover "so long as there are stars above you". Marilyn interpreted the opening lines as autobiographical from Wilson's point of view: "he knew that I was there and I would never leave him, so he knew that he could abuse me, even though he didn't try to. I was never number one, I was always two or three. But if I would leave in some kind of a way, he would get totally distraught."

Of the songs on Pet Sounds, "God Only Knows" is the most lyrically ambiguous. Commentators have sometimes attributed a suicidal quality to the protagonist. In the second verse, the narrator declares that "life would go on[...] should you ever leave me", but if that outcome were to occur, then "what good would living do me?"  The suggested implication is that they would end their life without their lover—an interpretation that Asher said was not intended by himself or Wilson. Among other interpretations, writer James Perone, who referred to the song as "one of the more unusual expressions of love in a 1960s' pop song", believed that there is "a hint that part of [the character's] 'love' may be self-serving and part of a cycle of codependency."  Cash Box described the song as a "slow-shufflin' tender, romantic ode about a guy who is so much in love that he doesn't think that he could go on without his gal."

Asher stated that the intended expression of the song's lyrics was I'll love you  the sun burns out, then I'm gone,' ergo 'I'm gonna love you forever. Wilson commented that song was based around "being blind but in being blind, you can see more. You close your eyes; you're able to see a place or something that's happening."

Composition

Key ambiguity and motifs

"God Only Knows" contains a weak tonal center that is closest to E major and, in other sections, A major. Adding to this, almost all of the chords are inverted.  An E major triad with its bass note in the root position is never invoked, and instead, the  position is favored. Of the tracks on Pet Sounds, it is the only one that lacks a strongly established primary key center (others employ key ambiguity to a lesser degree), and the only one that modulates its key up a fourth interval (others descend by a third).

In his book about Pet Sounds, Charles Granata writes that some of the musical devices that "God Only Knows" employs are usually "rather ordinary" by themselves. However, in this case, they were executed in a manner that was "far more sophisticated than anything the Beach Boys—or any other modern pop vocal group—had done before." According to musicologist James Garratt, the "tonal plasticity" made the song innovative not just in pop music, but also for the Baroque style it is emulating. He credits the sense of "expansiveness" evoked by the piece to this quality, emphasized by the disuse of authentic cadences and root-position tonics.  Lambert states that "a clear sense of key" eludes the listener "for the entire experience—that in fact, the idea of 'key' has itself been challenged and subverted".

The song  contains a recurring melodic motif that is reinforced by the lead vocal and the line played on French horn. Musician Andy Gill identified the verse and chorus melodies as variations on the same line, and added that this type of melodic variation was "very" similar to the technique as it is used in classical pieces such as Delibes' Lakmé.  To Lambert, the song's use of vocal counterpoints evoked the sacred traditions of a cantata by Bach or an oratorio by Handel. He likened the use of sustained strings to those employed by Wilson on the Pet Sounds tracks "Don't Talk (Put Your Head on My Shoulder)" and "I'm Waiting for the Day".

While some commentators have characterized Pet Sounds as a baroque pop album, musicologist John Howland argues that "God Only Knows" is the album's only track that can be described as such. "Baroque pop" was not used in reviews or critical discussions on Pet Sounds until rock critics in the 1990s began adopting the phrase in reference to artists that the album had influenced. Howland commented that some "classicistic gestures" are present in the orchestration for "God Only Knows", however, listeners must keep in mind that "orchestral instruments do not always signify baroque/classicistic textures".

Intro, verse, and refrain

"God Only Knows" starts with an A major chord accompanied by the sounds of accordions, harpsichord, and French horn, which are soon joined by bass, tambourine, and sleigh bells. At this point, the listener may hear the song as being in the key of A, although part of the line played on French horn includes a note (D) outside of that key. According to Lambert, "The ear wants to hear the music in the key of A, and is just starting to feel that it's okay to dismiss the horn note [until the proceeding verse section]."

The verses begin with a D chord, weakening the impression of an A key center, and is followed by a B minor6 chord, which does not strongly suggest the dominant (v) chord of E. As the verse develops, it gravitates closer to the key of E on the lines "you never need to doubt it / I'll make you so sure about it" before entering the hook line, "God only knows what I'd be without you", which begins with a return to an A major chord on the "God only" portion. The verse and refrain then repeats, this time with the addition of a string ensemble, before entering the next section of the composition.

Music theorist Daniel Harrison describes the progression as "highly chromatic" and writes, "in the absence of a strong E tonic, A major seems to fill the vacuum at the tonal center, since it is the chord that begins the refrain, and since it receives a strong tonic charge upon the resolution of the chord preceding the refrain. In addition, the opening chords of the verse, while nondiatonic to the nominative E major tonic,  diatonic to A." Lambert writes that the end of the refrain "recall[s] the chord progression of the introduction but[...] with an even slighter sense of tonal security." In a 2011 interview, Wilson commented that the melody of "I may not always love you" resembled the "I hear the sound of music" line from "The Sound of Music".

Break and coda

Like many of Wilson's compositions, "God Only Knows" subverted the then-standard 32-bar A-A-B-A pop song format. Following the second refrain, it segues into an instrumental linking passage, described by Dillon as an "avant-garde and unusually jarring transition for a tender love song" Lambert characterizes the passage as "a whirlwind of chord relations[...] based on wedging-together instrumental lines".

The song proceeds to repeat the progression of the verse and refrain, however, transposed up by a fourth and with the addition of new vocals. Multiple vocal parts are sung in counterpoint, a technique that is distinguished from the "oos" and "ahhs" style of vocals for which the Beach Boys are known. Lambert identifies this section as a "choral fantasy" of wordless voices that "climax[es] on a dramatic diminished chord". Music teacher Richard Battista, referring to this climax as a "sigh" from the singers, said that it is "totally unique in pop music. He didn't borrow that from the Four Freshmen, or the Everly Brothers, or the Coasters. That sigh is pure Brian Wilson." It concludes once again with the hook line, after which there is a repetition of the second verse.

According to Harrison, "The competition between E and A for tonic control is made clear during the break between verse 2 and the recapitulation of verse 1 lyrics.[...] the allusion to the harmonic structure of the verse is made subtle both by the transposition and by different melodic activity. Only when the music of the now A-major refrain is encountered do the voices return to their familiar words." Garratt writes, "While the idea of presenting the verse harmonies in the subdominant in the bridge was not new, what is striking here is the smoothness with which the song drops back into the original key – a moment rendered even more arresting by the truncated three-measure phrase that precedes it."  Fusilli remarked that Wilson nearly "wr[ote] himself into a dead end", elaborating that "when the song returns to D Major, it must do so from B minor, which is kind of a static change, particularly when the next chord is a B minor with only a slight variation in the bass."

The song ends with a final coda that features repeating vocal rounds—a centuries-old technique that was highly unusual for pop music of the era— with triplet fills played on a drum kit. Wilson's 2016 memoir states, "I liked all those old songs that used rounds, like 'Row, Row, Row Your Boat'  and 'Frère Jacques'. I liked rounds because they made it seem like a song was something eternal." At its conclusion, Lambert writes, "we hear A major chords that want to provide harmonic stability, but as before, the chords and vocal lines surrounding them make us want to think otherwise."

Recording

Backing track

Following several months of recording for the Pet Sounds album, instrumental tracking for "God Only Knows" began at 12:30a.m. on March 10, 1966, at the Studio 3 room of Western Studios, Hollywood, making it one of the last tracks to begin recording. The studio space was relatively small for the 20-some musicians that were hired for the session. Carl joined them on this occasion, playing 12-string electric guitar. As usual, Brian produced the session with engineer Chuck Britz.

Among the distinguishing features of the arrangement is an echo-laden "clip-clop" percussion part, sleigh bells played on every beat, and a low-range melodic phrases played on flute during the latter sections of the song.  A strip of masking tape was placed over the strings of a piano while the bottoms of two plastic orange juice bottles were used for percussion. Singer Danny Hutton was present at the session, as he recalled, "[Brian] would hear something wrong, and bam 'One more time.' I just sat there and didn't say a word. I had been in sessions where I thought to myself, they should do this and that. Not this time. I just shut up. What could I add?" Bruce Johnston, who joined the band a year earlier, later said that he "didn't realize just how great" Pet Sounds was going to be until he witnessed this session.

A total of 22 takes were attempted for the song. The musicians struggled to play the instrumental break to Wilson's satisfaction. To address this issue, pianist Don Randi suggested to Wilson that they play the parts in staccato, rather than in full quarter notes. Wilson enjoyed the effect and incorporated the change. A string section was subsequently overdubbed onto take 20, marked as "best". The session ended at 4:30a.m. The three-track recording of the instrumental was bounced to one channel of an eight-track tape to allow room for further overdubs.

Vocals
The first round of vocal overdubs were recorded later that day at Columbia Studios. Brian sang the lead vocal at this juncture, after which he mixed rough edits of the song on March 13 and 22. These early mixes featured a discarded saxophone solo in its bridge and a different, a capella ending. The ending was a fuller arrangement that included the voices of Marilyn, her sister Diane, and Byrds producer Terry Melcher. In Carl's recollection, "[E]everybody got in on it. It was like 'Come on out here into the studio.' Brian would make up a little part. That was fun; we listened to it endlessly."

On April 11, the band returned to Columbia to add further (and ultimately final) vocal overdubs. This time, Carl took on the lead. Dillon suggested that Brian may have changed his mind on the lead partly to address concerns over the large percentage of singing roles he was granting himself for the album. According to Carl, Brian later told him that "God Only Knows" was written for his voice: "He says it fits my beautiful spirit. I know I shouldn't be embarrassed by a compliment but..." Carl quoted the performance instructions he received from his brother: "Don't do anything with it. Just sing it real straight. No effort. Take a breath. Let it go easy." He had rarely sung lead on prior Beach Boys songs.

The coda was ultimately scaled down to three lines sung by two voices, Brian and Johnston. One of Wilson's lines duplicated the part that had been played on French horn. Johnston recalled, "at the end of the session, Carl was really fried, and he went home.[...] there were just [me and Brian]. So in the fade, he's singing two of the three parts. He sang the top and the bottom part and I sang in the middle." Of Wilson's decision to pare down the vocals, "It works because it caused a perfect vocal-to-track balance, and it's not too top-heavy. It's brilliant—a fine example of 'less is more.

The 1996 stereo mix of the song, created by Mark Linett for The Pet Sounds Sessions box set, does not feature the same singers on the fade-out. Linett explained in the liner notes, "Brian's vocal at the start of the fade of 'God Only Knows' is missing on the multi track having been sung by Carl sometime after the mix Brian used on the original record had been created. The part doesn't exist separate from the track so[...] it's not available for the stereo mix."

Release

"God Only Knows" was first released on May 14, 1966, as the opening track of side two on Pet Sounds.  In its review of the album, Disc & Music Echo referred to the song as "a standard gem with its hymnal feel." Norman Jopling of Record Mirror decreed that it had "a rollicking salvationist flavour but isn't going to convert anyone." Spencer Davis, frontman of the Spencer Davis Group, praised the song as the album's "most fantastic track" for a contemporaneous survey conducted by Melody Maker. At the suggestion of Johnston, Tony Rivers and the Castaways recorded a version of the song, which was issued about a week before the Beach Boys released their version as a single.

Brian had wanted to issue "God Only Knows" as a solo record by Carl, but according to Carl, Good Vibrations', which should have been our next single, didn't turn out the way Brian wanted. We had to have another release and so ['God Only Knows' came out as a Beach Boys single]." On July 18, the song was issued as the B-side of the "Wouldn't It Be Nice" single in the US. Radio programmers ultimately hesitated to add the song to their playlists due to the word "God". On September 24, it peaked in the Billboard charts separately from the A-side, at number 39. It was ultimately their last B-side to chart there. Later reports suggest that the song was banned from radio in parts of the southern US, a claim that is likely spurious.

In other countries, the sides of the single were reversed, with "God Only Knows" as the A-side. On July 22, it was released as the group's third Pet Sounds single in the UK, debuting at number 30 on the Record Retailer chart. It peaked at number 2 on August 27, behind the Beatles' "Yellow Submarine" / "Eleanor Rigby". In September, "God Only Knows" reached number 4 in Canada's RPM chart and number 24 on France's Music Media Monthly chart. In October, the single peaked at number 11 in the Netherlands and number 6 in Norway. In November, coinciding with the band's first tour of the UK, a God Only Knows EP was issued there. It contained the title track, "Here Today", "Sloop John B", and "Wouldn't It Be Nice".

Responding to the group's growing popularity among the British, a promotional film for the song, directed by band publicist Derek Taylor, was filmed for the UK's Top of the Pops on April 25. The film featured the group (minus Johnston) at Lake Arrowhead, flailing around in grotesque horror masks and playing Old Maid. The clip originally ran for five minutes and incorporated excerpts of "Wouldn't It Be Nice", "Here Today", and "God Only Knows". Due to concerns from the BBC over the horror masks, the clip was later trimmed and re-cut to feature only "God Only Knows". It premiered on BBC-1 on August 4, with a repeat airing on September 1.

Live performances

The Beach Boys first added the song to their live setlists on July 28, 1966, at a concert in Massachusetts. Reviewing their late 1966 European tour, Melody Maker critic Mike Henessey decreed that the live arrangement "sounded a little thin compared with the recorded [version]." Ray Coleman of Disc & Music Echo mentioned that performances of the song, however, still drew an "expected huge applause".

On August 25, 1967, the band (with Brian and minus Johnston) performed "God Only Knows" at a filmed concert in Honolulu. Footage of them playing the song at this show was later included in the 1984 documentary An American Band. On September 11, 1967, the band recorded another studio version of the song for a discarded, nominal live album known as Lei'd in Hawaii. The recording was released on the 1998 compilation Endless Harmony Soundtrack.

During their 50th-anniversary reunion tour, in 2012, the group played along to a pre-recorded vocal track taken from Carl's 1980 performance of the song at Knebworth. Mike Love said of Carl in a contemporary report, "Nobody ever could or will sing ‘God Only Knows’ as beautifully as he did. It's miserable that he's not there with us. Carl was the real stickler for making the band sound as absolutely perfect as could be. That influence is still felt to this day." The original performance was released on the 2002 live album Good Timin': Live at Knebworth England 1980.

Recognition and legacy

"God Only Knows" is often praised as one of the greatest songs ever written, as the Beach Boys' finest record, as Carl's best vocal performance, and as Brian's most quintessential work. Writing in his book America in the Sixties (2010), historian John Robert Greene identified the song as "one of the most complex—and beautiful—songs in the annals of American popular music" and credited it with remaking "the ideal of the popular love song. Granata deemed "God Only Knows" a musically and technically impressive accomplishment that Wilson and the Beach Boys never repeated on their subsequent records. In 2012, music journalist Dan Caffrey argued that the descriptor "teenage symphony to God", originally reserved for the band's Smile album, was better suited for "God Only Knows". He wrote that the song "has resonated with generations of music fans simply because of its concept", before concluding, "The entire world will listen to it for years to come."

Among Wilson's associates, Asher reflected, "This is the one that I thought would be a hit record, because it was so incredibly beautiful[...] I guess that in the end, [it] is the song that most people remember, and love the most." Carl referred to it as "the classic example [of Brian's writing] that takes it to a new plateau." Johnston opined that the song marked Carl's finest vocal performance: "Carl's vocal doubling is excellent—especially when he sings 'O what good would living do me?' He goes up a major third there, and it's just as clean as a whistle." The Wilsons' mother Audree commented, "What can you say about it? I still think it's one of his greatest pieces. I love it. So many times, I have thought how incredible it is that it's my son, my sons who did that." Don Randi remarked of the song, "That one, they should give to every music class, and say 'Here, do this one. Do it a capella.' Give 'em a key note and see what happens. There'll be a lot of suicides."

"God Only Knows" has occasionally appeared in other media. It served as a musical cue in the films Boogie Nights (1997) and Love Actually (2003). Author Thomas Pynchon paid homage to the song by incorporating it into the closing paragraphs of his Wilson-inspired novel Inherent Vice (2009). The 2013 video game BioShock Infinite contains a turn-of-the-century barbershop quartet that sings the song while floating past the player on an airship. The song was also used in the opening credits of the HBO series Big Love.

Other songwriters

Many songwriters, including Paul McCartney and Jimmy Webb, have cited "God Only Knows" as their personal favorite song.
 McCartney described it as "the greatest song ever written". His 1976 song "Silly Love Songs" incorporates a build-up of vocal counterpoints in the same style as "God Only Knows". The song additionally inspired, in part, the Beatles' "Here, There and Everywhere". Wilson felt uncomfortable with the praise and said in 1976 that if McCartney's "greatest song" assertion was true, "[then] what was there left for me to do?" In 2002, Wilson and McCartney performed the song as a duet at the Adopt-A-Minefield Benefit Gala in Los Angeles. McCartney later said that he was so overwhelmed by Wilson's presence that he "broke down" during the soundcheck rehearsals.
 Bono remarked that the string arrangement was "fact and proof of angels".
 Barry Gibb said that it "blew the top of my head off[...] My first thought was, oh dear, I'm wasting my time, how can I ever compete with that? We've [the Bee Gees] been competing with that ever since."
 Margo Guryan said that the song inspired her to pursue a career in pop music instead of jazz piano. She said, "I freaked [when a friend played me the song]. I thought it was just gorgeous. I bought the record and played it a million times, then sat down and wrote 'Think of Rain. 
 John Lennon, according to Rolling Stone co-founder Jann Wenner, "said he really dug [the song] and the world perked up".
 Pete Townshend said, God Only Knows' is simple and elegant and was stunning when it first appeared; it still sounds perfect".
 Webb enjoyed its Baroque influence and felt that it "represents the whole tradition of liturgical music that I feel is a spiritual part of Brian's music. And Carl's singing is pretty much at its pinnacle—as good as it ever got."

Accolades and polls
, "God Only Knows" is listed as the 16th most critically acclaimed song of all time on Acclaimed Music.

 In 2004, it was ranked number 25 in Rolling Stones list of the "500 Greatest Songs of All Time".
 In 2006, it topped Pitchforks list of the finest songs of the 1960s. Dominique Leone contributed for its entry, "if you need a tie into the legacy of 1960s youth culture, glance no further than the naïve but strained optimism locked inside this song."
 In 2008, Popdose staff members ranked it the best single of the previous 50 years, writing, "It is simply one of the most beautifully composed and arranged songs in the history of not just pop music, but Western music. To place 'God Only Knows' in its proper context is to [place it with] 1836 Frédéric Chopin."
 In 2011, Paste ranked the song number two on their list of the 20 greatest Beach Boys songs.
 In a 2012 reader's poll conducted by Rolling Stone, it was voted the best Beach Boys song; the editors wrote that it had won "by a significant margin" and added that it was "one of the most heart-melting love songs ever penned[...] gorgeous in its form and sentiment".
 In 2012, it topped Consequence of Sounds list of the "100 Greatest Songs of All Time".
 In 2016, it topped Pastes list of "The 100 Best Songs of the 1960s". 
 In 2021, it was re-ranked number 11 in Rolling Stones list of the "500 Greatest Songs of All Time".
 In 2022, The Guardian Alexis Petridis ranked the song number eight on his list of the 40 greatest Beach Boys songs.

Cover versions

"God Only Knows" has been covered by a wide variety of artists that includes Andy Williams, Neil Diamond, Olivia Newton-John, Glen Campbell, David Bowie,Toni Tennille, Joss Stone, Mandy Moore, Michael Stipe, Rivers Cuomo, JR JR, and Taylor Swift. In 2007, Lyle Lovett performed a rendition of the song during Wilson's Kennedy Center Honor commemoration. Wilson later said it was "the best version I ever heard, including the Beach Boys."

BBC Music version

To commemorate the launch of BBC Music, a cover version of the song was simulcast across BBC television and radio channels on October 7, 2014. It featured an assortment of artists (including Wilson himself) that were collectively credited as the Impossible Orchestra. The music video, directed by François Rousselet, showed the artists in lavish, fantastical computer generated settings. The track was released the following day as a charity single for Children in Need 2014.

Wilson said: "All of the artists did such a beautiful job [...] I can't thank them enough, I'm just honored that 'God Only Knows' was chosen. 'God Only Knows' is a very special song. An extremely spiritual song and one of the best I've ever written." However, the promotion drew much of the same criticisms that were afforded to the BBC's 1997 version of "Perfect Day".

Accompanied by the BBC Concert Orchestra, each of the following performers are listed in order of appearance, singing vocals unless otherwise specified:

Lauren Laverne, Gareth Malone, and Zane Lowe also appear in the video.

Personnel
Per band archivist Craig Slowinski.

The Beach Boys
 Carl Wilson – lead vocals, twelve-string electric guitar
 Bruce Johnston – backing vocals
 Brian Wilson – backing vocals

Guest
 Terry Melcher – tambourine

Session musicians (also known as "the Wrecking Crew")

 Hal Blaine – drums and sleigh bells
 Carl Fortina – accordion
 Jim Gordon – plastic orange juice cups
 Bill Green – flute and alto flute
 Leonard Hartman – clarinet and bass clarinet
 Jim Horn – flute and alto flute
 Carol Kaye – twelve-string electric guitar
 Larry Knechtel – harpsichord
 Jay Migliori – clarinet
 Frank Morocco – accordion
 Ray Pohlman – electric bass guitar
 Don Randi – tack piano with taped strings
 Alan Robinson – French horn
 Lyle Ritz – upright bass

The Sid Sharp Strings
 Jesse Erlich – cello
 Leonard Malarsky – violin
 Sid Sharp – violin
 Darrel Terwilliger – viola

Technical staff
 Chuck Britz – engineer (track)
 Ralph Valentin – engineer (vocals)
 "Don T." (uncertain) – second engineer (vocals)

Charts

Certifications

Notes

References

Bibliography

Further reading

External links

 Lyrics 
 Brian Wilson and George Martin dissect The Beach Boys’ ‘God Only Knows’ back in 1997
 
 
 
 
 
 

1966 songs
1966 singles
1960s ballads
The Beach Boys songs
Songs written by Tony Asher
Songs written by Brian Wilson
Song recordings produced by Brian Wilson
Capitol Records singles
Charity singles
All-star recordings
2014 singles
Brian Wilson songs
Glen Campbell songs
The Vogues songs
Baroque pop songs
Art pop songs
Avant-pop songs
Song recordings with Wall of Sound arrangements
Experimental pop songs
Pop ballads
Rock ballads